West Chester Boarding School for Boys, also known as Square House, is a historic boarding school and national historic district located in West Chester, Chester County, Pennsylvania. It was built in 1836 as a private academy, and is a three-story, five bay by four bay, brick building in the Federal style.  It measures 40 feet by 49 feet and has a low pitched gable roof with widow's walk.  The front facade has a two-story portico added in the mid-19th century. The school closed in 1862, after which the building was used as a private residence.

The building was listed on the National Register of Historic Places in 1990.

References

West Chester, Pennsylvania
School buildings on the National Register of Historic Places in Pennsylvania
Federal architecture in Pennsylvania
School buildings completed in 1836
Schools in Chester County, Pennsylvania
Historic districts on the National Register of Historic Places in Pennsylvania
1836 establishments in Pennsylvania
National Register of Historic Places in Chester County, Pennsylvania